Rashed Mohammed (Arabic:راشد محمد) (born 6 December 1995) is an Emirati footballer. He currently plays as a full back for Al Nasr.

External links

References

Emirati footballers
1995 births
Living people
Al-Nasr SC (Dubai) players
UAE Pro League players
Association football fullbacks
Footballers at the 2018 Asian Games
Asian Games bronze medalists for the United Arab Emirates
Asian Games medalists in football
Medalists at the 2018 Asian Games